St John the Evangelist's Church is the Church of England parish church of the village of Cowgill, Cumbria, England. It is in the deanery of Kendal, the Archdeaconry of Westmorland and Furness, and the Diocese of Carlisle. Its benefice is united with that of St Andrew, Dent.

It normally holds two services a month on the first (9am) and third (2.30pm) Sundays.  The church is a Grade II listed building.

History
The church was built in 1837–38, and has previously been known as Kirkthwaite Chapel, and Cowgill Chapel. It was designed by the Lancaster architect Edmund Sharpe. Its design is similar to that of Holy Trinity Church, Howgill, which dates from the same period. The foundation stone was laid on 30 June 1837 by Adam Sedgwick, Professor of Geology at Cambridge University. The church was consecrated on 31 October 1838 by the Bishop of Ripon. It provided seating for 250 people. The Church of England Commissioners transferred the parish to the Diocese of Carlisle in 2012.

Architecture
St John's is built of coursed sandstone rubble with slate roofs. Its architectural style is Early English. It has a six-bay nave, a single-bay chancel with a vestry to the north, a south porch, and a bellcote at the west end. Each bay has a lancet window, and there are buttresses between the bays. On the south side of the church is a wooden gabled porch. The bellcote has wooden louvres, and a steep pyramidal roof surmounted by a weathervane. At the gabled west end of the church is a central buttress flanked by lancets, above which is an oculus. The east window is a stepped triple-lancet. Inside the church are wall memorials to members of the Elam family and others. The single-manual organ was built by T Hopkins and Son.

External features
The wrought iron gates and the sandstone gate piers to the churchyard, dating probably from 1838, are also Grade II listed.

See also

Listed buildings in Dent, Cumbria
List of architectural works by Edmund Sharpe

References

19th-century Church of England church buildings
Churches completed in 1838
Church of England church buildings in Cumbria
Diocese of Carlisle
Edmund Sharpe buildings
Gothic Revival architecture in Cumbria
Gothic Revival church buildings in England
Grade II listed churches in Cumbria
St John the Evangelist's Church